Noriko Higashide (東出典子, born 22 July 1963 in Osaka, Japan) is an actress.

References

External links
JMDb profile 

Japanese actresses
1963 births
Living people
Actresses from Osaka